Pouilly-lès-Feurs (literally Pouilly near Feurs) is a commune in the Loire department and in the Auvergne-Rhône-Alpes region in central France.

Population

See also
Communes of the Loire department

References

Communes of Loire (department)